Francesco Albergati Capacelli (19 April 1728 – 16 March 1804) was an Italian writer and playwright.

Albergati was born in Bologna, where he was a marquess and senator and an important administrator. He led a stormy personal life and was married three times. He was accused of murdering his second wife Anna Grassi, a countess of Morcone in a fit of jealousy, and he had to flee from Zola Predosa. He returned after several years during which lived in different cities. His third wife wasted most of his remaining fortune.

But his passion for theatre encouraged him to write a series a number of works. He also translated a number of other important French works to Italian. He was also an avid writer who corresponded with a number of personalities including Carlo Goldoni, G. Compagnoni, Francesco Bertazzoli and Francesco Zacchiroli. He died in Zola Predosa,

Works
Le convulsioni (comedy in prose in one act)
Nuovo Teatro Comico (1774-1978), 5- volume series including 
Le convulsioni
Il ciarlatano maldicente
Pregiudizi del falso onore
Novelle morali ad uso dei fanciulli (1779)
Il Saggio Amico, Commedia (1769)
Pasquale ossia Il postiglione burlato (a joint dramatic work with  F. Malaspina, turned into a one-act drama by Filippo Pallavicino)

Translations from French
Ines de Castro, drama from Antoine Houdar de la Motte
Il conte di Commingio, drama from François-Thomas-Marie de Baculard d'Arnaud, translated in verse, Vérone, Stamperia Moroni, 1767
Phèdre from Jean Racine

Letters
Lettere piacevoli, se piaceranno (1792) to G. Compagnoni
Lettere varie (1793) to Francesco Bertazzoli.
Raccolta delle Lettere capricciose di Francesco Albergati Capacelli e di Francesco Zacchiroli dai medesimi capricciosamente stampate, Venice, 1786

Notes and references
Enrico Mattioda, Il dilettante per mestiere: Francesco Albergati Capacelli commediografo, Bologna, Il Mulino, 1993, (thesis).
Marina Vecchi Calore, Alcuni aspetti della personalità di Francesco Albergati Capacelli, in "Il teatro italiano in Europa", Firenze, Olschki, 1985.
John A. Rice, "Sense, Sensibility, and Opera Seria: An Epistolary Debate"

Specific

1728 births
1804 deaths
Italian dramatists and playwrights
Italian translators
Writers from Bologna
Italian male dramatists and playwrights
18th-century translators